Lasionycta luteola is a moth of the family Noctuidae. It is found from northern Washington and south-western Alberta northward to south-western Yukon.

It is found in the alpine tundra. Adults are predominantly nocturnal but also fly during the day and feed on nectar of Silene acaulis.

The wingspan is about 27 mm. Adults are on wing from mid-July to mid-August.

External links
A Revision of Lasionycta Aurivillius (Lepidoptera, Noctuidae) for North America and notes on Eurasian species, with descriptions of 17 new species, 6 new subspecies, a new genus, and two new species of Tricholita Grote
Images

Lasionycta
Moths of North America
Moths described in 1893